York County may refer to:

Places

Australia
York County, Western Australia
County of York (South Australia)

Canada
York County, New Brunswick
York County, Ontario

United Kingdom
Yorkshire, England
County of York, East Riding
County of York, North Riding
County of York, West Riding

United States
York County, Maine
York County, Massachusetts, a former county in what is now Maine
York County, Nebraska
York County, Pennsylvania
York County, South Carolina
York County, Virginia

Other
York County Community College, in Wells, Maine, United States
York County Hospital, a former hospital in York, England

See also
New York County